Wena profe (lit: Hey teacher) is a Chilean telenovela premiered on Televisión Nacional de Chile on September 25, 2017, and concluded on May 11, 2018. The series is written by Carlos Galofré, along with  Luis López-Aliaga, Rodrigo Ossandón and Francisca Fuenzalida. It stars Marcelo Alonso and María Elena Swett as the titular's character.

Plot 
When the musical career of Javier Meza (Marcelo Alonso), a failed upper-class musician, ends up collapsing, he decides to fool Bárbara Fernández (María Elena Swett), the rigid director of a school in Santiago, assuring that he is a teacher who seeks job. Thus little by little, the musician becomes fond of the course to which they are assigned, in addition to the director who is present in his heart. The problem arises when the teacher of quantum physics of the establishment and friend of Barbara, Rodrigo Sarmiento (Néstor Cantillana), discovers the lie of the singer without imagining that a love connection would form a trio between Javier, he and the director of the school that hides an unimaginable secret.

Cast 
 Marcelo Alonso as Javier Meza
 María Elena Swett as Bárbara Fernández
 Néstor Cantillana as Rodrigo "Chancho" Sarmiento
 Carolina Arregui as Ana María Sepúlveda
 Belén Soto as Florencia Domínguez / Meza Domínguez
 Bárbara Ruiz-Tagle as Macarena Palma Novoa
 Héctor Morales as Samuel Cornejo
 Alejandra Fosalba as Rosa Sanhueza
 Otilio Castro as Idefonso "Loco" Andrade
 Daniela Palavecino as Pamela Rojas
 Patricio Pimienta as Andrés Salas
 Matías Assler as Benjamín Salas
 Delfina Guzmán as Estela Novoa
 Patricio Achurra as Pedro Domínguez
 Gloria Laso as Loreto Montes
 Ana Reeves as Marta Contreras
 Amaya Forch as Jimena González
 Francisco Dañobeitía as Diego Vidal Fernández
 Juan Pablo Miranda as Patricio "Pato" Rojas
 Francisco Ossa as Manuel Castro Sanhueza
 Daniela Nicolás as Constanza Marshall
 Vivianne Dietz as Belén González
 Andrew Bargsted as Ignacio "Nashock" Castro Sanhueza
 Rodrigo Walker as Felipe "Pipe" Acuña Palma
 Valentina Becker as Trinidad Villarroel
 Santiago Urrejola as Ricardo "Zombi" Andrade
 Antonia Bosman as Antonia "Anto" Acuña Palma
 Ignacia Uribe as Josefina "Jo" Contreras
 Lucas Mosquera as Brooklyn
 Lorenzo Carrasco as Camilo Acuña Palma
 Antonella Orsini as Celeste Domínguez
 César Sepúlveda as Father of Diego
 Matilde Flores as Rocío Cornejo

References

External links 
 

2017 telenovelas
Chilean telenovelas
Televisión Nacional de Chile telenovelas
2017 Chilean television series debuts
2018 Chilean television series endings
Spanish-language telenovelas